The 1968 FIBA Europe Under-18 Championship was an international basketball  competition held in Vigo, Spain in 1968.

Final ranking
1. 

2. 

3. 

4. 

5. 

6. 

7. 

8. 

9. 

10. 

11. 

12.

Awards

External links
FIBA Archive

Under-18 
Under-18 
1968
FIBA U18 European Championship